Moasca is a comune (municipality) in the Province of Asti in the Italian region Piedmont, located about  southeast of Turin and about  southeast of Asti.

Moasca borders the following municipalities: Agliano Terme, Calosso, Canelli, Castelnuovo Calcea, and San Marzano Oliveto.

References

External links
 Official website 

Cities and towns in Piedmont